Edinburgh Square is a public space and historic site in Caledonia, Ontario.  It includes a War Memorial, and lawn bowling and baseball fields.  The Old Town Hall of Caledonia is located on the square.

The square
For many years, Edinburgh Square was one of five planned squares. The first Horticultural Society, organized in 1910, planted many trees and other plants on Edinburgh Square some of which are still standing around the Cenotaph. Prior to the construction of the Town Hall in 1857, Edinburgh Square was known as Market Square, as it was a market for farmer's produce and meats.

Over the years, tennis, lacrosse, boxing, ice skating on an outdoor rink and Canadian football have been played on the square. Rodeos and an annual circus also were held on this location. Until 1950, parties were held there during the July 1 celebrations. Those holiday events usually included an all-day baseball tournament, which continued until the festivities were relocated to the Band Shell in Kinsmen Park on the west side of town. The square was also the centre for political rallies.

The Edinburgh Square's baseball diamond is one of five diamonds in Caledonia, although, at one time, it was the only baseball diamond in Caledonia. The lawnbowling green there remains the only one in town. There is a Cenotaph, which each year draws large crowds for the November 11 Remembrance Day services. The number of cars parked on the square the first weekend in October indicates how large the crowd is for the annual Caledonia Fair held just east of the square on the fairgrounds. The outdoor ice rink during the winter months attracts hockey and skating enthusiasts from all parts of the community.

Old Town Hall
The Town Hall opened for its first council meeting on January 18, 1858. The architect was John Turner, a businessman and citizen of Brantford who had come to Canada from Great Britain in 1839. Turner was responsible for the design and construction of many public and commercial buildings across Southwestern Ontario between 1850 and 1886.

The Town Hall soon became the centre of the community. The basement housed the jail and a meat market. Until 1955 the main floor held the apartment quarters for the town's constable. The constable's wife was expected to serve meals to the prisoners, who were usually locked up for drunkenness.

The top floor of the Town Hall was used for council meetings, social events, concerts, wrestling matches, court hearings, short courses, W.I. meetings and scout meetings. A library was housed on the upper floor as well. In 1917 a polling station was located there.

After 1955, Council meetings were held on the main floor. Other than a place for the Public Utilities administration, Red Cross storage and a lawn bowling clubhouse, the Town Hall became relatively inactive. It stood almost vacant after Regional Government took over municipal affairs in 1974. At that time all administrative activities and Council Meetings were moved to an administration building in Cayuga.

In 1974, the proposal to tear down the Town Hall to make room for parking facilities met with public outcry. Although the building was mostly empty and in need of repair, the uproar convinced the town to save the building.  On January 25, 1982, it was designated as a Heritage building, and plans were made to convert the building into a museum. It would not be until the spring of 1988 that the old Town Hall was finally reopened, this time as the Edinburgh Square Heritage and Cultural Centre.

References

External links
Edinburgh Square Heritage & Cultural Centre

Municipal parks in Ontario
Parks in Haldimand County
Museums in Haldimand County
Local museums in Ontario